Miss USA 1968 was the 17th Miss USA pageant, televised live by CBS from Miami Beach, Florida on May 18, 1968 hosted by Bob Barker.

The pageant was won by Dorothy Anstett of Washington, who was crowned by outgoing titleholder Cheryl Patton of Florida.  Anstett was the first – and to date only – woman from Washington to win the Miss USA title, and went on to place as 4th runner-up at Miss Universe 1968.

Results

Placements

Special awards

Historical significance 
 Washington wins competition for the first time. Also becoming in the 15th state who does it for the first time.
 Maryland earns the 1st runner-up position for the first time and reaches the highest position since Mary Leona Gage initially won in 1957.
 Nevada earns the 2nd runner-up position for the third time. The last time it placed this was in 1961.
 Louisiana earns the 3rd runner-up position for the first time and reaches the highest position since Sharon Brown won in 1961.
 New Mexico earns the 4th runner-up position for the first time.
 States that placed in semifinals the previous year were Alabama, California, Maryland, Nevada, Tennessee and Virginia.
 California placed for the twelfth consecutive year. 
 Maryland and Tennessee placed for the third consecutive year. 
 Alabama, Nevada and Virginia made their second consecutive placement.
 Connecticut, Hawaii, New York and Ohio last placed in 1966.
 New Mexico and Michigan last placed in 1965.
 Louisiana last placed in 1961.
 Arkansas last placed in 1959.
 Washington last placed in 1958.
 Florida breaks an ongoing streak of placements since 1966.
 Arizona breaks an ongoing streak of placements since 1965.
 Texas breaks an ongoing streak of placements since 1964.
 District of Columbia breaks an ongoing streak of placements since 1962.

Delegates

 Alabama - Claudia Robinson
 Alaska - Sharon Long
 Arizona - Shirley Sprague
 Arkansas - Ann Smithwick
 California - Suzanne Fromm
 Colorado - Ann Bell
 Connecticut - Janice Shilinsky
 Delaware - Diane Parker
 District of Columbia - Dianne Mothershead
 Florida - Leslie Bauer
 Georgia - Midge Ivie
 Hawaii - Carol Seymour
 Idaho - Anna Evanson
 Illinois - Sandra Wolsfeld
 Indiana - Nikki Peck
 Iowa - Markie Anderson
 Kansas - Anne Layton
 Kentucky - Julia Pinkley
 Louisiana - Kathy Hebert
 Maine - Cheryl Campell
 Maryland - Paulette Reck
 Massachusetts - Sonia Prince
 Michigan - Virginia Clift
 Minnesota - Arlene Larson
 Mississippi - Brenda Conerly
 Missouri - Jan Barton
 Montana - Christina Baker
 Nebraska - Linda Dresher
 Nevada - Kathy Landry
 New Hampshire - Deborah Steers
 New Jersey - Linda Papa
 New Mexico - Bonnie Tafoya
 New York - June West
 North Carolina - Kelli Moore
 North Dakota - Jewel Christensen
 Ohio - Linda Hoyle
 Oklahoma - Linda Bertozzi
 Oregon - Marsha Mayer
 Pennsylvania - Barbara Verlander
 Rhode Island - Betty Lou Whitmore
 South Carolina - Kathryn Knoy
 South Dakota - Byrean Blacksmith
 Tennessee - Sandra Force
 Texas - Jeannie Wilson
 Utah - Shelley Cannon
 Vermont - Susan Glynn
 Virginia - Laurie Burke
 Washington - Dorothy Anstett
 West Virginia - Patricia Coyne
 Wisconsin - Janice Kropps
 Wyoming - Penny Smathers

External links 
 

1968
1968 in the United States
1968 beauty pageants